Donald Adam Hartman (August 3, 1929 – July 5, 1996) was the 33rd Mayor of Calgary from March 21, 1989 to October 23, 1989. He had been a city Alderman since October 22, 1969. As senior Alderman Hartman was appointed Mayor following Ralph Klein's resignation, serving only until the regular city elections that October. He died of cancer in 1996.

References 

Mayors of Calgary
1929 births
1996 deaths
Calgary city councillors
20th-century Canadian politicians